Telephone numbers in Europe are managed by the national telecommunications authorities of each country. The country calling codes start primarily with 3 and 4, however, some countries that by the Copenhagen criteria are considered part of Europe have country codes from the Asia range, starting with 9.

The international access code (dial out code) has been standardized as 00, as recommended by the International Telecommunication Union (ITU).

European Economic Area

Other European countries/territories

† = Disputed state, may not be recognized as an independent state by some or all European Union members.

*A variable dialing plan has different dialing procedures for local and long-distance telephone calls. A call within the same city or within an area is dialed only by the subscriber number, while for calls outside the area, the number must be prefixed with the destination area code. For fixed dialing plan it is always required to dial all digits of the complete telephone number, including any area codes, if implemented.

Asian regions with European history or heritage
Despite fulfilling the Copenhagen criteria for being part of Europe the following countries are in the Asian numbering group, having a country code starting with 9:
 +90 
 +995

One country that is geographically in Asia but is considered part of Europe for cultural and historical reasons, belong to the European group 3:
 +374

Harmonized service numbers
The following service numbers are harmonized across the European Union:

 112 for emergency services
 116xxx for (other) harmonized services of social value

Single numbering plan (1996 proposal)
Proposed Country Code: 3

In 1996, the European Commission proposed the introduction of a single telephone numbering plan, in which all European Union member states would use the code '3'. Calls between member states would no longer require the use of the international access code '00'. Instead the digit 1 was proposed for these calls, replaced by +3 for call from outside the EU. Each country would have a two-digit country code after the 1 or the +3. Calls inside each country would not be affected.

Option 3 : Creation, in addition to providing numbers for special services, of a clear European numbering identity (three digit numbering codes) by using the number "3" to proceed current national country codes (e.g. "333" for France or "344" for the UK). This would liberate up to 50 new country codes within Europe and allow the current codes starting with number "4" to be recycled within the world-wide numbering plan. 

This proposal would have required states like Germany, the United Kingdom, Denmark and others, whose country codes began with the digit '4', to return these to the International Telecommunication Union.

This would create four different ways of calling someone. For example, to call a number in Berlin, in Germany:

 xxxx xxxx (within Berlin)
 030 xxxx xxxx (within Germany)
 1 49 30 xxxx xxxx (within the EU)
 +3 49 30  xxxx xxxx (outside the EU)
 +49 30  xxxx xxxx (current system)

Such a scheme would also have affected Spain which uses +34. For example, to call someone in Barcelona:

 93x xxxxxx (within Spain)
 1 34 93x xxxxxx (within the EU)
 +3 34 93x  xxxxxx (outside the EU)
 +34 93x  xxxxxx (current system)

States like Ireland, Portugal, Cyprus and Finland, which used codes in the '35x' range, would adopt a different format. For example, to call a number in Dublin, Ireland:

 xxx xxxx (within Dublin)
 01 xxx xxxx (within Ireland)
 1 53 1 xxx xxxx (within the EU)
 +3 53 1 xxx xxxx (outside the EU)
 +353 1 xxx xxxx (current system)

A Green Paper on the proposal was published, but it was felt by many in the industry that the disruption and inconvenience of such a scheme would outweigh any advantages.

A disadvantage would have been that every local number beginning with "1" would have had to be changed (except emergency number which would be kept).

Another disadvantage would be that people wanting to call France (e.g. Southeast France using +33 4...) using an old number would connect another country like Spain, or people wanting to call Spain (e.g. +34 9...) would end up in e.g. Germany if they use an old number.

The EU proposal should not be confused with the European Telephony Numbering Space (ETNS) scheme, which uses the country code +388, and was intended to complement, rather than replace, existing national numbering plans.

See also
Telephone numbering plan
National conventions for writing telephone numbers
European Union roaming regulations
List of country calling codes
List of international call prefixes
:Category:Telephone numbers by country

Notes

References

External links
World Telephone Numbering Guide

International telecommunications
Telephone numbers
Telecommunications in Europe